Protécréa is a subsidiary of French broadcaster TF1, based in Paris. Productions from the company include the animated The Adventures of Paddington Bear (1997), The Mysteries of Providence, and The Bellflower Bunnies,  and the 1990s CNBC series Ushuaia: The Ultimate Adventure.

References 

Television production companies of France
Mass media in Paris